Eric D. Williams (born May 17, 1955) is a former American Football linebacker who played nine seasons in the National Football League. He played college football at Southern California. He was drafted 8th round of the 1977 draft by the St. Louis Cardinals.

Early days
Williams grew up in Kansas City, Missouri and was a star linebacker at Central High School. He earned All-City honors as a fullback and linebacker and was one of the first Central graduates to earn an athletic scholarship after he signed with USC.

College years
Williams played under renowned coach John Robinson at USC and played a key role in the Trojans' 11-1 season in 1976. He led the team in tackles (126) that season and made a key stop against Michigan in USC's Rose Bowl victory. Williams had another strong season in 1977 and was team captain and MVP of the defense.

Pro career
Williams was selected in the eighth round of the 1977 NFL Draft by the St. Louis Cardinals where he played five seasons. In 70 games, Williams intercepted five passes, recovered five fumbles, and recorded 5.5 sacks.

Williams reunited with John Robinson when he joined the Los Angeles Rams in 1982 and 1983 and played his final NFL season with the San Diego Chargers in 1984. Williams played for the Arizona Outlaws of the United States Football League in 1985 before hanging up the cleats.

After football
After retiring from football, Williams spent 30 years with the United Parcel Service and still resides in the St. Louis area. He was inducted into the Missouri Sports Hall of Fame in 2016.

References

1955 births
Living people
Players of American football from Sacramento, California
USC Trojans football players
St. Louis Cardinals (football) players
Los Angeles Rams players
San Diego Chargers players